UEPA may be:

 Pará State University
 Ukrainian Engineering Pedagogics Academy